Lah Var Hoseyn-e Olya (also Romanized as Lah Vār Ḩoseyn-e ‘Olyā) is a village in Zilayi Rural District, Margown District, Boyer-Ahmad County, Kohgiluyeh and Boyer-Ahmad Province, Iran. At the 2006 census, its population was 33, in 6 families.

References 

Populated places in Boyer-Ahmad County